The Flash is an American action television series developed by Greg Berlanti, Andrew Kreisberg, and Geoff Johns, airing on The CW. It is based on the DC Comics character Barry Allen / Flash, a costumed crimefighter with the power to move at superhuman speeds. It is a spin-off from Arrow, existing in the same fictional universe. The series follows Barry Allen, portrayed by Grant Gustin, a crime scene forensic investigator who gains superhuman speed, which he uses to fight criminals, including others who have also gained superhuman abilities.

In March 2022, the series was renewed for a ninth season, which premiered on February 8, 2023 and will serve as the series' final season.

Series overview

Episodes

Season 1 (2014–15)

Season 2 (2015–16)

Season 3 (2016–17)

Season 4 (2017–18)

Season 5 (2018–19)

Season 6 (2019–20)

Season 7 (2021)

Season 8 (2021–22)

Season 9 (2023)

Home media

References

External links
 
 

 
Flash
Flash
Flash
Flash